Bohumil Kafka (14 February 1878 in Nová Paka – 24 November 1942 in Prague) was a Czech sculptor and pedagogue.

He studied in Prague with sculptor Josef Václav Myslbek before moving to Vienna and then Paris to continue his studies. He worked in London, Berlin and Rome before returning and settling in Prague. He frequently worked in an Expressive symbolist style, was a noted animalier as well as being known for his decorative sculpture. He was considered a predecessor to the Art Nouveau style and was highly influenced by the works of Auguste Rodin.

Gallery

References
Mackay, James, The Dictionary of Sculptors in Bronze, Antique Collectors Club,  Woodbridge, Suffolk  1977
Matějček, Antonín and Zdeněk Wirth, Modern and Contemporary Czech Art, George Routledge & Sons, Ltd. London,  1924
Pavitt, Jane, Prague; The Buildings of Europe, Manchester University Press, Manchester,  2000

External links
Art Facts - brief biography
Radio Prague - extensive biography 
Index of Links for Artwork and Biographies
More Information 
Bohumil Kafka:Jan Zizka monument

1878 births
1942 deaths
Czech male sculptors
20th-century Czech sculptors
20th-century male artists
People from Nová Paka
Czechoslovak sculptors
Sculptors from the Austro-Hungarian Empire
Academy of Arts, Architecture and Design in Prague alumni